Caleta decidia, the angled Pierrot, is a species of blue butterfly found in south Asia and southeast Asia.

Description

The male's upperside is dark brown. Both wings crossed by a common broad band of white commencing at the second discoidal nervure of the anterior wing where it projects towards the outer margin. Underside is white having anterior wing with a small spot at base, a band before the middle, a large spot on the costal margin near the apex, a large spot at the anal angle, the apex which is marked by two white spots, the outer margin and a spot at its middle, all dark brown. Posterior wing is with a band near the base, a small spot on the inner margin, a large spot below this, a bifid spot near the apex, a spot between this and a series of submarginal lunular spots, all dark brown.

Range
The butterfly is found in Myanmar, Thailand, Laos, Vietnam, Cambodia, Nepal and India.

See also
 Caleta caleta, a blue butterfly species
 List of butterflies of India (Lycaenidae)

References

External links

Caleta (butterfly)